Tronnier is a surname and that refer to the following people:

Claudia Tronnier, Kurdish film producer (Kleine Freiheit)
Ellen Tronnier (1927–2015), All-American Girls Professional Baseball League player
Louis Tronnier (1897–1952), German Generalmajor in the Wehrmacht during World War II